The 2013 South Korean Figure Skating Championships was the South Korean Figure Skating Championships for the 2012–13 season. It was the 67th edition of those championships held. It was organized by the Korean Skating Union.

Skaters competed in the disciplines of men's and ladies' singles on the senior, junior, and novice levels for the title of national champion of South Korea. The results of the national championships were used to choose the Korean teams to the 2013 World Figure Skating Championships.

The competition was held between 4 and 6 January, 2013 at the Mokdong Ice Rink in Seoul.

Senior results

Men

Ladies

Junior results

Junior men

External links
2013 South Korean Figure Skating Championships
 Info
 Starting Order
 Day 1 Results: Junior Men SP, Junior Ladies SP, Junior Dance SD, Novice Men SP, Novice Ladies SP
 Day 2 Results: Senior Men SP, Senior Ladies SP, Junior Men FS, Junior Ladies FS, Junior Dance FD
 Day 3 Results: Senior Men FS, Senior Ladies FS, Novice Men FS, Novice Ladies FS** 

South Korean Figure Skating Championships
South Korean Figure Skating Championships, 2013
Figure skating
January 2013 sports events in South Korea